The Indian Institute of Technology Guwahati (IIT Guwahati) is a public technical university established by the Government of India, located in Amingaon area, North Guwahati Village area, in the state of Assam in India. It is the sixth Indian Institute of Technology established in India. IIT Guwahati is officially recognised as an Institute of National Importance by the government of India. IIT Guwahati has been ranked 7th in Engineering and 8th in Overall category in NIRF India Rankings 2021.

History
The history of IIT Guwahati traces its roots to the 1985 Assam Accord signed between the All Assam Students Union and the Government of India, which mentions the general improvement in education facilities in Assam and specifically the setting up of an IIT.

IIT Guwahati was established in 1994 by an act of parliament and its academic programme commenced in 1995. IIT Guwahati admitted its first batch of students into its Bachelor of Technology programme in 1995. The selection process was the same as that of the other IITs, i.e., through the Joint Entrance Examination. In 1998, the first batch of students were accepted into the Master of Technology program through the GATE.

Campus and geography
The campus of IIT Guwahati is on the northern banks of Brahmaputra and abuts the North Guwahati town of Amingaon. It is often considered as the most beautiful campus in India. The campus is on a  plot of land around 20 km from the heart of the city. It has the Brahmaputra on one side and hills and vast open spaces on others.

IIT Guwahati is a fully residential campus. All the students live in hostels on the campus. The hostels are named after rivers and tributaries of North-East India: Manas, Dihing, Kapili, Siang, Kameng, Barak, Subansiri (girls' hostel), Umiam, Dibang, Brahmaputra (largest hostel in all the IITs), Dhansiri (new girls' hostel), Lohit and Disang (new boys' hostel). Apart from these, there is a married scholars' hostel for married postgraduates. Most students at IIT Guwahati are given a separate room. Each room comes equipped with requisite  basic amenities. The toilets and bathrooms are shared (three of each for every ten rooms on average). Every hostel has a mess, a canteen, a juice centre, a stationery shop, a library, a TV room, a sports room (for indoor sports), and laundry facilities. The hostels are provided with 24-hour Internet facility. The boys hostels are single seated, i.e., every boarder gets a single room.

Organisation and administration

Governance

All IITs follow the same organization structure which has President of India as visitor at the top of the hierarchy. Directly under the president is the IIT Council. Under the IIT Council is the board of governors of each IIT.
Under the board of governors is the director, who is the chief academic and executive officer of the IIT. Under the director, in the organizational structure, comes the deputy director. Under the director and the deputy director, come the deans, heads of departments, registrar.

Departments

IIT Guwahati houses the following departments:

Department of Biosciences and Bioengineering
Department of Chemical Engineering
Center of Excellence for Sustainable Polymers
Department of Chemistry
Department of Civil Engineering
Department of Computer Science and Engineering
Department of Design
Department of Electronics & Electrical Engineering (previously known as the Department of Electronics and Communication)
Department of Humanities and Social Sciences
Department of Mathematics
Department of Mechanical Engineering
Department of Physics

The aforementioned departments of the Institute offer B. Tech., B. Des., M. Des., M. Tech., M.A. (Development Studies),
(Liberal Arts), M.Sc. and Ph.D. programmes.

Academic centres
IIT Guwahati is home to nine academic centres.

 Centre for Disaster Management and Research                             
 Centre for Drone Technology
 Centre for the Environment              
 Centre for Indian Knowledge Systems 
 Centre for Intelligent Cyber-Physical Systems
 Centre for Linguistic Science and Technology
 Centre for Nanotechnology
 Centre for Rural Technology
 Centre for Sustainable Polymers
 Centre for Sustainable Water Research

Academic schools

School of Agro and Rural Technology
School of Business
Mehta Family School of Data Science and Artificial Intelligence
School of Energy Sciences and Engineering
School of Health Science & Technology.

Extramural centres
IIT Guwahati is home to five academic centres.
Central Instruments Facility
Centre for Computer & Communication Centre                                                
Centre for Career Development.
Centre for Creativity
Centre for Educational Technology

Academics
Presently there are about 7047 students on rolls, 406 faculty members and 510 support staff.

Admission
Admission in IIT Guwahati for UG Courses is done through JEE Advanced for Engineering. Until 2015, admissions in UG Design Course was happening through JEE Advanced. It now happens through UCEED.
Admission in PG is done through IIT-JAM, GATE score, and through CEED for Designing, while through Ph.D-NET examination or Ph.D. entrance examination and/or interview one can get admission into Ph.D. Courses.

Rankings

Internationally, IIT Guwahati was ranked 384 in the QS World University Rankings of 2023. 

In India, among engineering colleges, it ranked 7 by the National Institutional Ranking Framework in 2022 and 7 among government colleges by Outlook India.

Param Ishan
IIT Guwahati hosts Param-Ishan which is the fastest and most powerful super computer in northeastern, eastern and southern regions of the country.

Student life

Annual festivals
Every year the students and administration of IIT Guwahati come together to organize a number of festivals and competitions. The major festivals include Alcheringa, the annual cultural festival, Techniche, the annual techno-management festival, Udgam, the annual entrepreneurship summit and Research Conclave. Apart from these the Students of IIT Guwahati participate in the annual Inter IIT Sports Meet. Apart from these the General Championship (GC) is widely celebrated across the hostel communities in the institute, the combined score in the inter hostel meets Kriti (Tech), Manthan (Cultural) and Spardha (Sports) is used to decide the winning hostel.

Alcheringa

Alcheringa, popularly known as "Alcher", is the annual cultural extravaganza of the IIT Guwahati. It started in 1996 as a student-run nonprofit organisation catering primarily to the youth of the nation. Held for three days and four nights, Alcheringa's 2018 edition witnessed an estimated footfall of 1,00,000 people.

Alcheringa has hosted famous Indian and international artists. The list includes world's fastest guitar shredder Michael Angelo Batio, Swiss folk metal band Eluveitie, Israeli progressive metal band – Orphaned Land, Portuguese beat boxer Rizumik, Irish metal band – Frantic Jack, Pakistani pop rock band – Strings, Villalobos Brothers – the Mexican trio and an alternative rock group from New York City – Betty in the international section.

Indian artists like Vishal–Shekhar, Mohit Chauhan, Sonu Nigam, Javed Ali, Shaan, K.K, Shankar–Ehsaan–Loy, Shilpa Rao, RDB, Anoushka Shankar, Pt.Vishwa Mohan Bhatt, rock band Euphoria, Vir Das and  Kalki Koechlin add stature to the list.

Alcheringa 2018, titled "Echoes of Innocence", the twenty-second edition of the festival starred Bollywood dynamic duo, Vishal–Shekhar, Portuguese House producer, Diego Mirandaand Australian House producers, Mashd N Kutcher, alternative rock band from Chennai, The F16's and classical music maestros and brothers, Ganesh and Kumaresh and legendary Padma Shri Awardee Shahid Parvez.
Alcheringa 2020 starred Bollywood Singer Jubin Nautiyal it was sponsored by The Red Chief.

Techniche

Techniche is the techno-management festival of IIT Guwahati. Techniche is held in September every year over three days. Techniche hosts various events, competitions, exhibitions and workshops.

Techniche conducts Technothlon and provides students from schools and colleges across India a platform to interact with many experts in subject areas through its lecture series. It has been attended by R. Chidambaram, Kiran Bedi, H. C. Verma, Mike Fincke, John C. Mather and others.

Guwahati Half Marathon is hosted by Techniche a week before the event.

Udgam
Udgam, is the annual Entrepreneurship Summit of IIT Guwahati. Organized by the institute's Entrepreneurial Cell, it aims to inspire young students and graduates of North-East India to embrace entrepreneurship . Apart from a series of talks by eminent entrepreneurs there are plethora of workshops & networking sessions which happen during the festival. It is usually held as an annual three-day summit in January.
It is the flagship event of the Entrepreneurial Development Cell, IIT Guwahati. It was conceptualized to develop and spread the spirit of entrepreneurship among the youth of the North-East, and India in general thus earning itself the reputation of being the largest E-Summit in the north-east. E-Cell, IIT Guwahati, is a special interest group under Technical Board of the Students Gymkhana Council, IIT Guwahati and is responsible for activities and initiatives which would instil and promote the spirit of entrepreneurship amongst the student community. To foster an environment which is conducive to entrepreneurship, we at E-Cell organize lectures, events and workshops to create a platform for them to realize their potential and showcase their bright ideas in front of public and industry.

Research Conclave 
Research Conclave is organized under the banner of Students' Academic Board (SAB) of Indian Institute of Technology Guwahati (IITG). It is a staunch platform to nurture the young minds towards research, innovation and entrepreneurship, which intends to bring the undivided attention of the students towards both industries and academia to redress the academic research challenges, concerns of the entire student community and upcoming entrepreneurs around the globe.
Research Conclave has gone from strength to strength since its inception and now boasts of being one of the largest of its kind in India with the 2019 edition witnessing participants from over 30 states and union territories of India. It has been attended by H. C. Verma, Dr. Raksh Vir Jasra, M. S. Ananth, Padma Shri Awardee A. S. Kiran Kumar and others.

Collaborations 
IIT Guwahati has partnered with National Thermal Power Corporation (NTPC) to design and develop a highly energy-efficient plant for capturing  from power plants. This plant was developed by a research team led by Prof. Bishnupada Mandal, Department of Chemical Engineering, IIT Guwahati. This project is stands to benefit the petroleum industry, as well as strengthen the United Nations' Sustainable Development Goals (SDGs).

See also
Sukumar Nandi

References

External links
IITG Main Site

Guwahati
Engineering colleges in Assam
Educational institutions established in 1994
1994 establishments in Assam